The 1995 Advanta Championships of Philadelphia was a women's tennis tournament played on indoor carpet courts at the Philadelphia Civic Center in Philadelphia, Pennsylvania in the United States that was part of the Tier I category of the 1995 WTA Tour. It was the 13th edition of the tournament and was held from November 6 through November 12, 1995. First-seeded Steffi Graf won the singles title and earned $148,500 first-prize money.

Finals

Singles

 Steffi Graf defeated  Lori McNeil 6–1, 4–6, 6–3
 It was Graf's 8th singles title of the year and the 94th of her career.

Doubles

 Lori McNeil /  Helena Suková defeated  Meredith McGrath /  Larisa Savchenko 4–6, 6–3, 6–4

References

External links
 ITF tournament edition details
 Tournament draws

Advanta Championships of Philadelphia
Advanta Championships of Philadelphia
Advanta Championships of Philadelphia
Advanta Championships of Philadelphia
Advanta Championships of Philadelphia